Andrey Krasnov (born 6 July 1981) is a retired Kyrgyzstani footballer who played for various clubs in his country including Dordoi-Dynamo Naryn. He was a member of the Kyrgyzstan national football team.

International career stats

Goals for senior national team

External links

1981 births
Living people
Kyrgyzstani footballers
Kyrgyzstan international footballers
FC Dordoi Bishkek players
Kyrgyzstani people of Russian descent

Association football forwards